Northern Belle may refer to:
 FV Northern Belle, a fishing vessel that sank in the Gulf of Alaska on 20 April 2010
 Northern Belle (train), a luxury train in the UK
 Northern Belle (1875 ship), a steamship that served Great Lakes ports, until she was destroyed in a sudden fire
 Northern Belle, heroic efforts saved the crew of this widely publicized wreck